Electoral district IX (Croatian: IX. izborna jedinica) is one of twelve electoral districts of Croatian Parliament.

Boundaries  
Electoral district IX consist of:

 whole Lika-Senj County;
 whole Zadar County;
 whole Šibenik-Knin County;
 northern part of Split-Dalmatia County including cities and municipalities: Dicmo, Dugopolje, Hrvace, Kaštela, Klis, Lećevica, Marina, Muć, Okrug, Otok, Prgomet, Primorski Dolac, Seget, Sinj, Trilj, Trogir, Vrlika.

Election

2000 Elections 
 

SDP - HSLS
 Šime Lučin
 Joško Kontić
 Ingrid Antičević-Marinović
 Ivan Ninić
 Mario Kovač
 Romano Meštrović

HDZ
 Nikica Valentić
 Drago Krpina
 Ivo Baica
 Anton Kovačev
 Božidar Kalmeta

HSS - LS - HNS - ASH
 Ante Markov
 Vesna Pusić

HSP - HKDU
 Boris Kandare

2003 Elections 
 

HDZ
 Božidar Kalmeta
 Darko Milinović
 Perica Bukić
 Jure Bitunjac
 Šime Prtenjača
 Jozo Topić
 Emil Tomljanović
 Ana Lovrin
 Niko Rebić

SDP
 Šime Lučin
 Ingrid Antičević-Marinović

HNS
 Ivica Maštruko

HSP
 Tonči Tadić

HSS
 Ante Markov

2007 Elections 
 

HDZ
 Božidar Kalmeta
 Darko Milinović
 Ante Kulušić
 Ante Sanader
 Ivo Grbić
 Perica Bukić
 Emil Tomljanović
 Ana Lovrin
 Niko Rebić
 Nedjeljka Klarić

SDP
 Ranko Ostojić
 Ingrid Antičević-Marinović
 Ante Kotromanović
 Brankica Crljenko

2011 Elections 
 

HDZ - HGS
 Božidar Kalmeta
 Darko Milinović
 Ante Kulušić
 Ante Sanader
 Branko Kutija
 Milan Jurković
 Nevenka Bečić
 Goran Pauk

SDP - HNS - IDS - HSU
 Ranko Ostojić
 Ingrid Antičević-Marinović
 Ante Kotromanović
 Franko Vidović
 Jozo Radoš
 Petar Baranović

2015 Elections 
 

HDZ - HSS - HSP AS - BUZ - HSLS - HRAST - HDS - ZDS
 Tomislav Karamarko
 Josipa Rimac
 Božidar Kalmeta
 Ante Sanader
 Darko Milinović
 Goran Pauk
 Josip Bilaver
 Ivan Šipić

SDP - HNS - HSU - HL SR - A-HSS - ZS - SDSS
 Ranko Ostojić
 Ivan Klarin
 Sabina Glasovac
 Ingrid Antičević-Marinović

Most
 Stipe Petrina
 Miro Bulj

2016 Elections 
 

HDZ
 Miro Kovač
 Branka Juričev-Martinčev
 Grozdana Perić
 Ante Sanader
 Darko Milinović
 Nediljko Dujić
 Hrvoje Zekanović
 Davor Lončar

SDP - HNS - HSS - HSU
 Ranko Ostojić
 Sabina Glasovac
 Ivan Klarin
 Franko Vidović

Most
 Miro Bulj
 Marko Vučetić

2020 Elections 
 

HDZ
 Božidar Kalmeta
 Ivan Malenica
 Grozdana Perić
 Ante Sanader
 Marijan Kustić
 Rade Šimičević
 Nediljko Dujić
 Luka Brčić

SDP - HSS - HSU - SNAGA - GLAS - IDS - PGS
 Franko Vidović
 Renata Sabljar-Dračevac
 Matko Kuzmanić

DP - HS - BLOK - HKS - HRAST - SU - ZL
 Karolina Vidović Krišto
 Hrvoje Zekanović

Most
 Miro Bulj

References 

Electoral districts in Croatia